The 1934–35 Michigan Wolverines men's basketball team represented the University of Michigan in intercollegiate basketball during the 1934–35 season.  The team compiled an 8–12 record and 2–10 against Big Ten Conference opponents.

Franklin Cappon was in his fourth year as the team's head coach.  Alfred Plummer was the team captain, and Richard Joslin was the team's leading scorer with 71 points in 18 games for an average of 3.9 points per game.

The team's second leading scorer, Johnny Gee, went on to play as a pitcher in Major League Baseball from 1939 to 1946. Chelso Tamagno went on to play two seasons with the Akron Goodyear Wingfoots in the National Basketball League.  Matt Patanelli was selected as the Most Valuable Player on the 1936 Michigan Wolverines football team.

Scoring statistics

References

Michigan
Michigan Wolverines men's basketball seasons
Michigan Wolverines basketball
Michigan Wolverines basketball